"Ooh, Yes I Do" is the ninth single by the Dutch girl group Luv', released in the autumn of 1979 by CNR/Carrere Records. The song appears on the group's 1979 third studio album True Luv'. It was a hit in Benelux, Denmark, France, Austria and Germany. The Spanish version of the record turned gold in Mexico.

Background
In the summer of 1979, Luv' and their producers and songwriters (Hans van Hemert and Piet Souer) decided to leave Philips/Phonogram Records (which had released the group's records for two years). José Hoebee, Patty Brard, Marga Scheide and their team signed a 750,000 Dutch Guilder contract with CNR affiliated to Carrere Records on October 7th, 1979. With this new deal, Luv's challenge was to prove that after one year and a half of mainstream success, the trio could still score hit records in the music charts. The formation's first single released by Carrere was "Ooh, Yes I Do", a track composed and produced by Van Hemert. The song used a melody inspired by the flute theme of ABBA's "Gimme! Gimme! Gimme! (A Man After Midnight)" (1979). It became an instant hit. A Spanish version (entitled "Si, Que Si") was recorded for the Latin American market and reached the gold status in Mexico.

In 2021, DJ WR (Wouter Reinders) and DJ BarFeet (Maarten Bervoets) posted the uptempo remixes of "Ooh, Yes I Do" and "Si, Que Si" on their YesterMix's YouTube channel.

Commercial performance
Ooh Yes I Do was a Mexican #1 hit, a Top 5 hit in Denmark and the Netherlands, a Top 10 record in Belgium and France, a Top 20 single in Austria and a Top 30 song in Germany.

The single sold 200.000 copies in France.

Track listing and release

CNR/Carrere licensed the rights for Luv's records to various labels around the world.

7" Vinyl 

 a. "Ooh, Yes I Do"
 b. "My Guy"

Cover versions

 In 1980, Franz Lambert covered the song for the German compilation "Pop-Orgel Hit-Parade 6".
 In 2006, Dutch drag queen Lola recorded a version of "Ooh, Yes I Do".

Charts and certification

Weekly charts

Year-end charts

References

1979 singles
Luv' songs
Songs written by Hans van Hemert
Carrere Records singles
1979 songs
RCA Records singles
EMI Records singles